The 1985 season was the fifth in the history of Wollongong City (now Wollongong Wolves). It was also the fifth season in the National Soccer League. In addition to the domestic league, they also participated in the NSL Cup. Wollongong City finished 10th in their National Soccer League season, and were eliminated in the NSL Cup second round by Newcastle Rosebud United.

Players

Overview

Competitions

National Soccer League

League table

Results by round

Matches

NSL Cup

Statistics

Appearances and goals
Players with no appearances not included in the list.

Clean sheets

References

Wollongong Wolves FC seasons